Jordan Zunic (born 27 December 1991) is an Australian professional golfer.

After winning the 2013 Tasmanian Open and the 2014 China Amateur, Zunic turned professional in January 2015. He won the 2015 BMW New Zealand Open in March.

Personal life
Zunic is the son of Zoran and Tania Zunic. His father played basketball in the National Basketball League (NBL) for the Sydney Supersonics (1983) and Sydney Kings (1988). His brother, Kyle, also plays in the NBL.

Amateur wins
2010 New South Wales Junior Boys
2014 China Amateur
Source:

Professional wins (4)

PGA Tour of Australasia wins (3)

PGA Tour of Australasia playoff record (0–2)

Other wins (1)
2013 Tasmanian Open (as an amateur)

Playoff record
European Tour playoff record (0–1)

Results in World Golf Championships

"T" = Tied

Team appearances
Amateur
Australian Men's Interstate Teams Matches (representing New South Wales): 2012 (winners), 2013, 2014

References

External links

Australian male golfers
PGA Tour of Australasia golfers
1991 births
Living people